TB and Chest Hospital also known as Erragadda Chest Hospital is a tuberculosis hospital located in Hyderabad, India. The 670-bed hospital is located on 65 acres near Erragadda

History
The palace was donated to be converted into a hospital by the VII Nizam Mir Osman Ali Khan. Erramanzil belonged to the same family. Their tombs, Fakhrul Mulk, still exists at SR Nagar.

After Telangana was formed in 2014, the new Chief Minister K C Rao planned to demolish the centuries-old Irranuma Palace and build a new secretariat in its place.

References

Tuberculosis sanatoria
Hospitals in Hyderabad, India
Tuberculosis in India
Heritage structures in Hyderabad, India